The 1988 Brazilian Grand Prix was a Formula One motor race held on April 3, 1988, at the renamed Autódromo Internacional Nelson Piquet in Rio de Janeiro. Following his 3rd World Drivers' Championship in  the Jacarepaguá Circuit was named after local hero Nelson Piquet. It was the first race of the  Formula One season.

Background
Winter testing had indicated Ferrari would be maintaining the edge that they had gained by winning the final two races of the  season despite only having an updated version of their 1987 car, with McLaren-Honda and Williams, now with naturally aspirated Judd V8 engines, also producing cars that looked like potential race winners.

Ferrari had dominated the pre-season tests in Rio with times that were not only faster than everyone else, but faster than had been recorded at the 1987 Brazilian Grand Prix, prompting rumors that the team had either shut off the FIA's mandatory pop-off valve which in 1988 limited turbo boost pressure to just 2.5 Bar, or more likely were running the 1987 valve which had a 4.0 Bar limit (most of the team engineers agreed that in 1988 the turbo engines had lost approximately  due to the reduction in boost). The rumors were renewed during qualifying in Brazil when neither Michele Alboreto nor Gerhard Berger could get near their test times from a month earlier and both drivers complained of engines that were down on power, too thirsty and had poor throttle response out of the slower corners.

During the qualifying session, there was controversy when Nelson Piquet made comments in the local media publicly insulting Ayrton Senna, though he later claimed he did not know he was talking to a journalist and was forced to withdraw his allegation under threat of a lawsuit (over time, these insults by Piquet – with the aid of Prost – also extended to claims that Senna was homosexual, particularly given his failed marriage in 1982; as it transpired in a 1990 interview of Senna by Brazilian edition of Playboy the gay claim may have been motivated by the fact that Senna had apparently had a relationship with Piquet's wife when she was single). The World Champion had also been insulting about Nigel Mansell's wife Roseanne (calling her an "unattractive boxhead"), and both drivers' families.

BMS Dallara's Alex Caffi had to use a modified Formula 3000 chassis because the Formula One chassis was not ready. This was also the last time Ford-Cosworth DFV engine was used in a Formula One Grand Prix.

Drivers making their debut in Rio were: Brazilian Maurício Gugelmin (March-Judd), Spanish driver Luis Pérez-Sala (Minardi-Ford), Argentine Sportscar driver Oscar Larrauri (EuroBrun-Ford) making his F1 debut at the age of 33, Briton Julian Bailey (Tyrrell-Ford) who had sold just about everything he owned in order to pay for his drive with Ken Tyrrell's team, and young German Formula 3 Champion Bernd Schneider signed with Zakspeed. Of the new drivers, only Bailey and Schneider failed to qualify.

EuroBrun (with Larrauri and 1987 International Formula 3000 champion Stefano Modena) and Rial Racing, with veteran Andrea de Cesaris as its sole driver, were making their F1 debuts as constructors. The EuroRacing side of the EuroBrun team had formerly run the Alfa Romeo team in 1982–85, while Rial, run by German Günter Schmid, was virtually a born-again ATS which had competed in F1 in 1977–84. Both teams would use the 3.5L Ford DFZ V8 engine.

Qualifying
Just five months after his crash during qualifying for the 1987 Japanese Grand Prix, Mansell produced a sensational performance to qualify his naturally aspirated Williams second, 1.5 seconds faster than the next 'atmo' car, the Benetton-Ford of Thierry Boutsen in 7th. On the pole was Senna in his first drive for McLaren with a time almost two seconds slower than Mansell's 1987 pole time. The second row was occupied by Gerhard Berger's Ferrari and Alain Prost's McLaren. After only a small amount of testing at Imola before joining in the Rio tests due to the late finish of the car, neither Senna or Prost were happy with the balance of their McLaren MP4/4s in qualifying.

By qualifying on the front row, Mansell became the first driver of a naturally aspirated (atmo) car to start on the front row of a Grand Prix since his former Williams teammate Keke Rosberg had put his Williams-Ford on pole position for the 1983 Brazilian Grand Prix at the same circuit.

The four non-qualifiers were the Tyrrell-Ford of Julian Bailey, the turbo Zakspeeds of Piercarlo Ghinzani and Schneider, and the turbo Osella of Nicola Larini. Alex Caffi failed to pre-qualify his converted F3000 Dallara.

Race summary
On the parade lap, Senna's gear selector mechanism broke and he had to complete the lap jammed in first gear. The first start was aborted and Senna started in the spare car from the pits. At the second start, Alain Prost with no one in front of him due to Senna's absence, won the start and put in one of his famous first laps that saw him lead by almost 2 seconds, with Mansell in 2nd place, though he was soon passed by Berger's Ferrari. After running in the hot air behind the turbocharged Ferrari, on lap 19 Mansell's temperature gauge showed that the Williams was overheating (at the first aborted start Mansell had been forced to drive off around the track, thankfully without penalty, due to his Judd V8 already overheating on the grid). He entered the pits to investigate, handing third to Nelson Piquet in his Lotus; during the process, Mansell stalled his engine.

Senna was making a remarkable drive from the rear of the grid, climbing to 21st on lap 1 (after almost colliding with the March of his former flatmate Maurício Gugelmin who suffered gearbox failure less than 50 metres after the start of his debut race and pulled to the inside of the track as Senna was leaving the pits), 15th on lap 4, 8th on lap 10, into the points on lap 13 and by lap 20 was in second place after passing Piquet on the back straight following a pit stop to Berger.

In previous years with high horsepower, the Rio circuit had proved savage on tyres and drivers were forced to stop two or three times a race for new rubber. With the reduction of turbo boost in 1988, tyre wear was reduced and McLaren figured on only one stop for their drivers. Prost pitted on lap 26 without losing the lead, and Senna pitted a lap later. During his stop Senna stalled his Honda engine and dropped to sixth place. Shortly afterwards he was shown the black flag and disqualified for changing cars after the green flag had been shown following the parade lap, a move that was not allowed. Over the last 10 laps of the race Berger closed to within 10 seconds of leader Prost, but the Frenchman was merely pacing himself to make sure he finished on the now lower fuel limit and Berger was unable to catch him.

Piquet, the reigning World Champion, came home third in his first drive for Lotus ahead of Derek Warwick in the Arrows-Megatron. Michele Alboreto in the second Ferrari and Satoru Nakajima in the second Lotus rounded out the points with 5th and 6th places. The first atmospheric car to finish was the Benetton-Ford of Thierry Boutsen. Nakajima and Boutsen both finished a lap down on Prost in 7th place. The first race of FISA's new equivalency formula in a bid to make the 'atmos' competitive had seen turbos still take all the points on offer.

Classification

Pre-qualifying

Qualifying

Race

Championship standings after the race

Drivers' Championship standings

Constructors' Championship standings

 Note: Only the top five positions are included for both sets of standings.

References

Brazilian Grand Prix
Brazilian Grand Prix
Grand Prix
Brazilian Grand Prix